Solomon ben Shalom Pergamenter was a 19th-century Austrian Hebrew writer and poet. He was the author of Yesode ha-Lashon (1813), in Yiddish, for self-instruction in Hebrew, and of several Hebrew poems. He edited the sixth volume of the Hebrew literary-scientific annual Bikkure ha-Ittim in 1825.

References
 

Year of death unknown
Year of birth unknown
19th-century Austrian male writers
19th-century Austrian poets
19th-century Jews
Austrian Hebraists
Austrian Jews
Grammarians of Hebrew
Jewish poets